Amata insularis is a species of moth of the family Erebidae first described by Arthur Gardiner Butler in 1876. It is found in Queensland, Australia.

References 

Insul
Moths of Australia
Moths described in 1876